Xiyuan Temple or Xiyuan Jiechuanglü Temple is a Buddhist temple in Wuzhong District, Suzhou, Jiangsu, China. It is located just to the west of Lingering Garden.

History
The temple was founded in the Yuan dynasty, was destroyed and then became part of a large classical garden, Xiyuan or West Garden. The garden belonged to a Senior Government Official during the Ming Dynasty. When he died, his son donated the garden to the monastery. Most of the buildings were destroyed during the Taiping Rebellion in 1860. It was rebuilt after the war.

The temple is known for its statues, Arhat Hall and Free Life Pond, where 2 famous long-life Asian Giant Softshell Turtles lived. One turtle died in 2007 at the age of 400, and the other has disappeared.

References
LI Shang-quan. Suzhou Western Garden Buddhist Culture Research[J]. Journal of Nanjing Xiaozhuang University. No.1 Jan. 2007.

External links
Jiechuang Buddhist Educational Website

Buddhist temples in Suzhou